The Kemaman River (Terengganu: Sunga Mmamang) is a river in Terengganu state Malaysia. At 167 km long, it is the longest river in the state and the third longest river in East Coast Peninsular Malaysia after Pahang River and Kelantan River.

See also
 List of rivers of Malaysia

References

Rivers of Terengganu
Rivers of Malaysia